Dyschirius milloti is a species of ground beetle in the subfamily Scaritinae. It was described by Jeannel in 1949.

References

milloti
Beetles described in 1949